Chapali Height 2  is a Nepali psychological thriller film directed by Dipendra K. Khanal and produced by Arjun Kumar. The film stars Avash Shrestha, Paramita Rana and Mariska Pokharel. It is the sequel to the 2012 film Chapali Height.

Plot
Abhiman Jung Shahi is a rich and spoiled man whose lifestyle revolves around casual sex. He decides to change his promiscuous ways when he falls in love with Aakriti (Mariska). After much persuasion, Aakriti is impressed with the change in his behaviour and starts dating him. Their relationship deteriorates when Abhiman begins seeing his former girlfriend Nisha Joshi (Paramita).

Cast
Ayushman Joshi as Abhiman Jung Shahi
Paramita Rana as Nisha Joshi
Mariska Pokharel as Aakriti Thapa
Rear Hang Rai as Bullet
Muna Gauchan as Ruby
Jeet Bahadur Tong as Banjhakri
Laxmi Purai as Mata
Meghana Choudhary as Dancer Girl 
Sunil Basnet as Aviman's Father

Crew
Choreographer: Kabiraj Gahatraj
Music: Arjun Kumar
Lyrics: Suresh Rai
Singers: Dharmendra Sewan, Santosh Lama
Stylist: Sanna Gurung
Chief Assistant Director: Tara Neupane
Post-Production: Aslesha Entertainment
Action: Surya Thokar
Production Manager: Buddhi Lal Magar
Writer: Shan Basnyat
Colorist: Prabin Manadhar
Background Score: Iman Bikram Shah
Re-Recording/Sound Engineer: Uttam Neupane
Editor: Dirgha Khadka
Cinematographer: Niraj Kadel
Producer: Arjun Kumar
Story/Director: Dipendra K Khanal

Soundtrack

International release
The film was released in Australia on 18 August, 2016.

References

2010s Nepali-language films
Nepalese thriller films
 Films shot in Kathmandu
Films directed by Dipendra K Khanal
Nepalese sequel films